Hank Ballard (born John Henry Kendricks; November 18, 1927 – March 2, 2003) was an American singer and songwriter, the lead vocalist of The Midnighters and one of the first rock and roll artists to emerge in the early 1950s. He played an integral part in the development of the genre, releasing the hit singles "Work With Me, Annie" and answer songs "Annie Had a Baby" and "Annie's Aunt Fannie" with his Midnighters. He later wrote and originally recorded (in 1959) "The Twist" which was notably covered a year later by Chubby Checker, this second version spreading the popularity of the dance. He was inducted into the Rock and Roll Hall of Fame in 1990.

Early years
Born John Henry Kendricks in Detroit, Michigan, he and his brother, Dove Ballard, grew up and attended school in Bessemer, Alabama, after the death of their father. He lived with his paternal aunt and her husband, and began singing in church. His major vocal inspiration during his formative years was the "Singing Cowboy", Gene Autry, and in particular, his signature song, "Back in the Saddle Again". Ballard returned to Detroit in his teens and later worked on the assembly line for Ford.

Hank Ballard and the Midnighters

In 1953, Ballard joined doo-wop group the Royals, which had previously been discovered by Johnny Otis and signed to Federal Records (a division of King Records), in Cincinnati. Ballard joined Henry Booth, Charles Sutton, Sonny Woods and Alonzo Tucker in the group, replacing previous singer Lawson Smith.

The Royals released "Get It" (1953), an R&B song with possibly sexually oriented lyrics, which some radio stations refused to play, although it still made it to number 6 on the Billboard R&B chart.

The group then changed its name to the Midnighters to avoid confusion with the "5" Royales. In 1954, Ballard wrote a song called "Work with Me, Annie" that was drawn from "Get It". It became the Midnighters' first major R&B hit, spending seven weeks at number 1 on the R&B charts and also selling well in mainstream markets, along with the answer songs "Annie Had a Baby" and "Annie's Aunt Fannie"; all were banned by the FCC from radio air play. Their third major hit was "Sexy Ways", a song that cemented the band's reputation as one of the most risqué groups of the time.

They had four other R&B chart hits in 1954–55, but no others until 1959, by which time the group was billed as "Hank Ballard and The Midnighters" with their label changed from Federal to King, the parent label. Between 1959 and 1961 they had several more both on the R&B and Pop charts, starting with "Teardrops on Your Letter", a number 4 R&B hit in 1959 that had as its B-side the Ballard-written song "The Twist". A few months later, Chubby Checker's cover version of the song went to number 1 on the pop charts. It would return to the top of the charts again in 1962 – the only song in the rock and roll era to reach number 1 in two different non-consecutive years.

Ballard and the Midnighters had several other hit singles in 1962, including the Grammy-nominated "Finger Poppin' Time" (1960) and "Let's Go, Let's Go, Let's Go" (1960) which hit number 7 and number 6, respectively, on the Billboard pop charts. They did not reach the charts again after 1962 and dissolved in 1965.

Later career

After the Midnighters disbanded, Ballard launched a solo career. His 1968 single, "How You Gonna Get Respect (When You Haven't Cut Your Process Yet)", was his biggest post-Midnighters hit, peaking at number 15 on the R&B chart. James Brown produced Ballard's 1969 album You Can't Keep a Good Man Down. A 1972 single, "From the Love Side", credited to Hank Ballard and the Midnight Lighters, went to number 43 on the R&B chart. Ballard also appeared on Brown's 1972 album Get on the Good Foot, on two tracks, "Recitation By Hank Ballard", that features Ballard describing Brown and the album, and “Funky Side of Town”, in duet, with James Brown.

One-off sides, “Sunday Morning , Coming Down “, and “I’m a junkie for my Baby’s Love “, followed in the ‘70s. He had some dancers out in the mid-‘70s, like “Hey There Sexy Lady “ and “Let’s Go Streaking “ (recorded by Hank in the nude). A beat ballad was also released, “Love On Love”.

In 1979, he had moderate success with the disco 
number, “Freak Your Boom-Boom“.

During the 1960s, Ballard's cousin, Florence Ballard, was a member of the Detroit girl group the Supremes. In the mid-1980s, Ballard re-formed The Midnighters and the group performed until 2002.

Death
On March 2, 2003, he died at age 75 of throat cancer in his Los Angeles home. He was buried at Greenwood Cemetery in Atlanta, Georgia.

Legacy
In 1990, Ballard was inducted into the Rock and Roll Hall of Fame; the other Midnighters were inducted in 2012.

In 2010, Hank Ballard & The Midnighters were voted into the Michigan Rock and Roll Legends Hall of Fame.

Ballard was the great uncle of NFL player Christian Ballard.

Discography

Solo albums
 A Star in Your Eyes (King Records, 1964)
 You Can't Keep a Good Man Down (King Records, 1968)
 Hanging with Hank (Stang Records, 1976)

Singles
Note:  Credited as Hank Ballard and the Midnighters unless stated otherwise.

References

External links
 A history of The Midnighters
 [ Allmusic profile]
 
 Discography at Soulfulkindamusic
 

1927 births
2003 deaths
20th-century African-American male singers
American funk singers
American rock singers
Rock and roll musicians
Deaths from cancer in California
Deaths from esophageal cancer
Federal Records artists
James Brown vocalists
The Midnighters members
King Records artists
Musicians from Detroit
People from Bessemer, Alabama